Parthenocissus , is a genus of tendril climbing plants in the grape family, Vitaceae. It contains about 12 species native to the Himalayas, eastern Asia and North America. Several are grown for ornamental use, notably P. henryana, P. quinquefolia and P. tricuspidata.

Etymology
The name derives from the Greek parthenos, "virgin", and kissos (Latinized as "cissus"), "ivy".  The reason is variously given as the ability of these creepers to form seeds without pollination or the English name of P. quinquefolia, Virginia creeper, which has become attached to the whole genus.

Fossil record
Among the middle Miocene Sarmatian palynoflora from the Lavanttal Basin Austrian researchers have recognized Parthenocissus fossil pollen. The sediment containing the Parthenocissus fossil pollen had accumulated in a lowland wetland environment with various vegetation units of mixed evergreen/deciduous broadleaved/conifer forests surrounding the wetland basin. Key relatives of the fossil taxa found with Parthenocissus are presently confined to humid warm temperate environments, suggesting a subtropical climate during the middle Miocene in Austria.

Food plants
Parthenocissus species are used as food plants by the larvae of some Lepidoptera species including the brown-tail and Gothic.

Species

From Asia 
Three leaved
Parthenocissus chinensis, this species grows in dry areas between 1300 and 2300 m in China in the west of both Sichuan and Yunnan.
Parthenocissus heterophylla, from China and Taiwan
Parthenocissus semicordata, from the Himalayas
Parthenocissus feddei, this species grows in rocky places between elevations of 600 and 1100 m in the Chinese provinces of Guangdong, Guizhou, Hubei and Hunan
Five leaved
Parthenocissus henryana, Chinese Virginia creeper from China
Parthenocissus laetevirens
One or three leaved
Parthenocissus dalzielii, from east and south-east Asia
Parthenocissus suberosa
Parthenocissus tricuspidata, Japanese creeper or Boston ivy, from eastern Asia

From North America 
Seven or five-leaved
Parthenocissus heptaphylla, sevenleaf creeper, from Texas and Mexico
Parthenocissus vitacea, thicket creeper, woodbine, or grape woodbine, from western and northern North America
Parthenocissus quinquefolia, Virginia creeper, from eastern North America

References

 
Vitaceae genera